Dane McDonald (born 14 July 1987) is an Australian rugby league player, who last played for Sheffield Eagles in the European Co-operative Championship. He previously played for Burleigh Bears and Wests Tigers.

McDonald missed much of the 2009 season with a broken thumb.

References

1987 births
Living people
Australian rugby league players
Sheffield Eagles players
Burleigh Bears players
Rugby league halfbacks
Rugby league locks